Peter Lahdenpera (December 29, 1935 – July 3, 2019) was an American skier. He competed at the 1960 Winter Olympics, 1964 Winter Olympics, and 1972 Winter Olympics. Lahpendera was the director of the United States biathlon team at the 1976 Winter Olympics. Lahdenpera had emigrated to the United States from Finland.

References

External links
 

1935 births
2019 deaths
American male biathletes
American male cross-country skiers
Olympic biathletes of the United States
Olympic cross-country skiers of the United States
Biathletes at the 1964 Winter Olympics
Cross-country skiers at the 1960 Winter Olympics
Sportspeople from Helsinki
Finnish emigrants to the United States